Agaraea semivitrea is a moth of the family Erebidae. It was described by Walter Rothschild in 1909. It is found from northern South America, including Venezuela and Peru north to the US state of Texas.

Adults are on wing year round in Costa Rica.

References

Moths described in 1909
Phaegopterina
Moths of North America
Moths of South America